Local elections were held in Kwale to elect a Governor and County Assembly on 4 March 2013. Under the new constitution, which was passed in a 2010 referendum, the 2013 general elections were the first in which Governors and members of the County Assemblies for the newly created counties were elected.

Gubernatorial election

Prospective candidates
The following are some of the candidates who have made public their intentions to run: 
 Mohammed wa Mwachai - Forest and Wildlife Permanent Secretary 
 Kassim Riga - Mombasa Polytechnic University College Lecturer
 Simeon Mkallah - former Kinango MP and Kenya African National Union Chief Whip
 Michael Nyanje 
 Salim Mphurya

References

 

2013 local elections in Kenya